Gregory J. Vincent is the 21st President of Talladega College located in Talladega, Alabama. He is a national expert on civil rights, social justice, and campus culture. Vincent recently served as Professor of Educational Policy and Law, Inaugural Executive Director of the Education and Civil Rights Initiative, and Program Chair of the Ph.D. Senior Diversity Officer Specialization at the University of Kentucky.  He previously served as the twenty-seventh President of the Hobart College and the sixteenth of William Smith College.

Education
A native of New York City, Vincent attended public school and graduated from the Bronx High School of Science in 1979.

He received his bachelor's degree in history and economics from Hobart and William Smith Colleges in 1983. At the Colleges, he was on the Hobart basketball, cross-country and track & field teams. He also served as a resident assistant. When he graduated, he was presented with the Dr. Martin Luther King Jr. Leadership Award.

Vincent then received his J.D. degree from the Ohio State University Moritz College of Law in 1987 and his Ed.D. degree in education from the University of Pennsylvania in 2004. He is a Life Member of Alpha Phi Alpha fraternity.  Vincent served as the forty-eighth Grand Sire Archon of Sigma Pi Phi Fraternity.

Career
Vincent served at The University of Texas at Austin as Vice President for Diversity and Community Engagement, W.K. Kellogg Professor of Community College Leadership and Professor of Law. During his appointment from 2005-2017, the Division of Diversity and Community Engagement grew to encompass a $50 million budget and more than 400 employees, 50 units, and 300 community partners and is now recognized as a national model. While at the University of Texas, Vincent served as a spokesperson for the Fisher v. University of Texas case that was argued twice before the Supreme Court [see Fisher v. University of Texas (2013) and Fisher v. University of Texas (2016)].

From 2003 to 2005, Vincent served as vice provost for institutional equity and diversity and law professor at the University of Oregon. From 1999 to 2003, Vincent served as vice provost for academic affairs and campus diversity and law professor at the Louisiana State University. From 1995 to 1999, he served as assistant vice chancellor for academic affairs at the University of Wisconsin-Madison.

Prior to entering academia, Vincent served as the assistant attorney general in the Office of the Ohio Attorney General where he successfully argued several major civil rights cases before the Supreme Court of Ohio. These included Little Forest Medical Center of Akron v. Ohio Civil Rights Commission and The State, Ex Rel. Natalina Food Company, Appellant, v. Ohio Civil Rights.

Vincent is CEO of Vincent Strategies LLC, a global Diversity, Equity and Inclusion consulting. firm and GregoryVincentLaw, an Ohio Law Firm focusing on Civil Rights, Education and Employment.

Awards and service
In 2016, he was named the Educator of the Year by the University of Pennsylvania. He received the Ohio State University Moritz College of Law Distinguished Service Award in 2012.

Controversy
In 2018, Vincent was accused of plagiarizing several passages in the literature review section of his dissertation by an anonymous source claiming to be a Hobart and William Smith Colleges faculty member. Several media outlets confirmed that passages from his literature review were not cited correctly.

However, based on a review conducted by Penn's Graduate School of Education faculty members, Vincent was given the opportunity to make revisions to the literature review portion of his dissertation, under Penn Graduate School of Education faculty supervision, which were completed to their satisfaction and meant his degree now stands.

References

External links
Hobart and William Smith Colleges profile

Year of birth missing (living people)
Living people
The Bronx High School of Science alumni
Hobart and William Smith Colleges alumni
Ohio State University Moritz College of Law alumni
University of Pennsylvania Graduate School of Education alumni
African-American academics
21st-century African-American people